The World union for peace and fundamental human rights and the rights of peoples (abbreviated  UNIPAX) is a Non-governmental organization (NGO), non-partisan, non-sectarian and unrelated to the economic interests of the parties, which operates nationally and internationally.

UNIPAX is associated with the United Nations Department of Public Information (DPI) of the United Nations (UN) and is actively involved in the dissemination and promotion of initiatives that affect their organisations, agencies and institutions, as well as other initiatives of the Council of Europe, the European Union and its institutions.

UNIPAX’s information and participatory services are aimed at all those who want to be agents of peace and builders of a new humanism for the respect of human rights and of people all over the planet.

History 

Since 1969 some Europeanists of the city of  Bassano del Grappa - Vicenza (Italy) give rise to a series of initiatives that anticipate and prepare the foundation of UNIPAX which deals, in a particular way, "to education to European Union, fundamental human rights and global community”. 
In the book "Twenty years of commitment to Europe" there is a summary of the main initiatives for the period 1969-1989.

The most significant initiatives of UNIPAX:

From 1980 to 1995 she operated a pilot project of “Education to Europe” in about 1500 schools of all types and levels in the Veneto region.

Between 1997 and 2007 annually publishes the Collection of briefings UNDERSTAND THE WORLD devoted to UN, EU, the challenges of the 21st century and promotes between 2000 and 2010 the Universal Service for Peace.

From 2005 she published a monthly newsletter UNIPAX "by the UN to the citizen"  (in Italian and English) on current international institutional, with specific reference to issues related to the human rights key, with the aim to raise awareness of the most important international events of great importance to the values of peace and civil coexistence.

In 2006 she collaborated and funded educational activities organised by the Association of expats and former expats "The Suitcase /La Valigia".

In 2007 she was a partner in the project "The Ariadne's wire" for the integration of immigrant pupils in Italian schools.

In 2008 was a partner in the project "Educating intercultural", to promote the spread between the pupils of the schools of experiences in a foreign land through contacts with the representatives of the associations of emigrants.

In 2008, in collaboration with other partners, the project "Web Radio European Parliament Education", supported by the European Parliament on the occasion of the 50th anniversary of its launch, to raise awareness of the European Union and in particular, the role of this Parliament. 
UNIPAX has edited and produced:
 a series of lectures in e-learning education in Europe in the 23 Community languages, see on Internet Archive at Ciao Europe,
 the contents of a web radio news cycle for the first time made up of students from about 30 partner institutions in many countries of the European Union.

Between 2009 and 2010 she collaborated with the Ministry of Education, Universities and Research (Italy) (MIUR)  to the project EUisU!, supported by the European Parliament.

The EUisU! project was intended to inform and educate all students in Italian schools of the second degree to learn more about the EU, its institutions and the feedback of its activities in the daily life of European citizens. 
The students involved have produced movies in Web TV on matters concerning the European Union, intercultural and respect for fundamental human rights.

UNIPAX also disseminates the message of the Secretary-General for the celebration of World Days of UN and original videos produced directly by the United Nations.

Notes

See also
 Human rights
 Rights
 Universal Declaration of Human Rights
 Peace
 Humanism

External links 
  UNIPAX site
 Fundamental rights

Human rights organisations based in Italy
Peace organisations based in Italy